Melanella bipartita is a species of sea snail, a marine gastropod mollusk in the family Eulimidae. The species is one of a number within the genus Melanella .

References

External links
  Mörch O.A.L. (1859). Beiträge zur Molluskenfauna Central-Amerika's. Malakozoologische Blätter. 6(4): 102-126
 Skoglund C. (1992). Additions to the Panamic Province Gastropod (Mollusca) literature 1971 to 1992. The Festivus. 24 (supplement): i-viii, 1-169

bipartita
Gastropods described in 1860